Events from the year 1841 in Canada.

Incumbents
Monarch: Victoria

Federal government
Parliament: 1st (starting June 15)

Governors
Governor General of the Province of Canada: Charles Poulett Thomson, 1st Baron Sydenham
Governor of New Brunswick: William MacBean George Colebrooke
Governor of Nova Scotia: Lucius Cary, 10th Viscount Falkland
Civil Governor of Newfoundland: John Harvey
Governor of Prince Edward Island: Henry Vere Huntley
Governor of Canada West: John Clitherow then Richard Downes Jackson

Premiers
Joint Premiers of the Province of Canada —
William Henry Draper, Canada West Premier
Samuel Harrison, Canada East Premier

Events
February 10 – The Union of Upper and Lower Canada establishes the Province of Canada.
June 15 – The 1st Parliament of the Province of Canada meets at Kingston.
October 2 – The Canada Gazette publishes its first issue.
December 20 – The Kingston Common Council establishes a police force.
The Dawn Settlement, in what is now Dresden, Ontario, is established to provide self-help for Blacks in agricultural communities.

Births

January 15 – Frederick Stanley, 16th Earl of Derby, Governor General of Canada (died 1908)
March 9 – Robert Atkinson Davis, businessman, politician and 4th Premier of Manitoba (died 1903)
April 15 – Joseph E. Seagram, distillery founder, politician, philanthropist and racehorse owner (died 1919)
April 21 – Jennie Kidd Trout, physician, first woman in Canada legally to become a medical doctor and only woman in Canada licensed to practice medicine until 1880 (died 1921)
May 8 – John Norquay, politician and 5th Premier of Manitoba (died 1889)
August 3 – Juliana Horatio Ewing, poet and writer of children's novels set in Canada.(died  1885)
August 10
James David Edgar, politician (died 1899)
Oronhyatekha, Mohawk physician, CEO of an international benefit society, native statesman, scholar, rights campaigner and international shooter (died 1907)

September 13 – George Airey Kirkpatrick, politician (died 1899)
September 18 – George William Ross, educator, politician and 5th Premier of Ontario (died 1914)
November 20 – Wilfrid Laurier, politician and 7th Prime Minister of Canada (died 1919)
December 23 – John Brown, politician, miller, mining consultant and prospector (died 1905)

Deaths

References 

 
Canada
Years of the 19th century in Canada
1841 in North America